Burak Özçivit (born 24 December 1984) is a Turkish actor and model who is best known for his roles in Çalıkuşu (2013–2014) and Kara Sevda (2015–2017). He is currently starring as Osman Bey in the history-based, adventure series Kuruluş: Osman (2019–present). Throughout his acting career Özçivit has been a recipient of numerous accolades.

Early life 
Burak Özçivit was born on 24 December 1984 in Istanbul, Turkey. He was educated at Kazım İşmen High School and graduated from Marmara University, Faculty of Fine Arts, Department of Photography.

Career 
In 2003, Özçivit was elected the Top Model of Turkey and began working with modeling agencies. In 2005, he was chosen the second best model of the world. Özçivit's acting career began with the television series Eksi 18 in 2006. He later starred in series Zoraki Koca, İhanet and Baba Ocağı. He appeared in the  movie Musallat and as Çet/Çetin (original Chuck Bass) and starred in the television series  Küçük Sırlar, the Turkish adaptation of Gossip Girl. He the starred in Muhteşem Yüzyıl as Malkoçoğlu Balı Bey.

Özçivit then appeared as Kamran in the TV adaptation of Çalıkuşu opposite Fahriye Evcen. Together with Evcen, he made the movie Aşk Sana Benzer and later played in the movie Kardeşim Benim opposite Murat Boz. In 2015 he starred in Turkish drama series Kara Sevda as Kemal Soydere. The series became a hit across the world. Özçivit also owns a production company named BRK's production. As of 2023, he has been portraying the role of the founder of the Ottoman Empire, Osman Bey in the TV series Kuruluş: Osman. The series has gained worldwide popularity and is very famous in south Asia, central Asia, the Middle East and Latin America.

Personal life 
Özçivit is a practicing Muslim. He resides in Istinye, Sarıyer, Istanbul.

He became engaged to Turkish actress Fahriye Evcen on 9 March 2017 in Germany, and they married in Istanbul on 29 June 2017. Together the couple have two sons, named Karan (born 2019) and Kerem (born 2023).

Filmography

Film

Television

Advertising

Awards and nominations

References

External links

1984 births
21st-century Turkish male actors
Turkish Muslims
Turkish Sunni Muslims
20th-century Muslims
21st-century Muslims
Turkish male models
Models from Istanbul
Living people
Turkish male television actors
Turkish male film actors
Male actors from Istanbul